Martin Josef Říha (11 November 1839, Oslov – 7 February 1907, České Budějovice) was a Czech Roman Catholic clergyman. From 1885 until his death he was bishop of České Budějovice.

Sources
http://www.biographien.ac.at/oebl_9/163.pdf
http://www.catholic-hierarchy.org/bishop/briha.html

1839 births
1907 deaths
People from Písek District
Bishops of České Budějovice
20th-century Roman Catholic bishops in Austria-Hungary